War of the Sky Cities is a 1979 board wargame published by Fantasy Games Unlimited.

Gameplay
War of the Sky Cities is a two player game in which post-holocaust human and mutant survivors engage in battle using huge flying cities.

Reception
J. S. Thomas reviewed War of the Sky Cities in The Space Gamer No. 30. Thomas commented that "If you are a fan of tactical space combat and want a quick, simple game, this might be worth a look. But as a game of sky cities, it just doesn't fly."

References

Board games introduced in 1979
Fantasy Games Unlimited games